Le Guislain is a commune in the Manche department in north-western France.

In 2019, it had a population of 143.

See also
Communes of the Manche department

References

Guislain